AE Goodwin was an Australian heavy engineering firm, which produced railway locomotives and rolling stock, as well as roadmaking machinery at its factory in Auburn.

History
Founded in December 1935 by Arthur Elliott Goodwin, the company was originally based in Lidcombe. In 1946 it relocated to St Marys and in the late 1960s to Auburn. In the mid 1950s it became the Australian licence holder for American Locomotive Company (Alco) products, building over 400 diesel locomotives between December 1955 and November 1972. In 1961 the company was taken over by household appliance manufacturer AG Healing.

AE Goodwin collapsed in November 1972. It was purchased from its administrator by Comeng, who completed the outstanding locomotives on order, six 442 class for the Public Transport Commission, one M636 for Hammersley Iron and four M636s for Mount Newman Mining at the Auburn factory before closing it.

Production
Diesel locomotives manufactured included:

New South Wales Government Railways
100 44 class
40 45 class
165 48 class
34 442 class

South Australian Railways
37 930 class
44 830 class
7 600 class
6 700 class

Silverton Tramway
3 ST class

Hamersley Iron
12 Alco 636
19 MLW M636

Mount Newman Mining
17 ALCO Century 636
 MLW M636C++
++ 27 built in total by AE Goodwin and Comeng, split unknown

Robe River Mining
7 MLW M636

See also
List of locomotive builders

References

External links
Magazine advertising by AE Goodwin

Defunct railway companies of Australia
Engineering companies of Australia
Vehicle manufacturing companies established in 1935
Australian companies established in 1935
Manufacturing companies disestablished in 1972
Australian companies disestablished in 1972
Defunct locomotive manufacturers of Australia